Alejandro Sawa Martínez (15 March 1862 – 3 March 1909) was a Spanish bohemian novelist, poet, and journalist.

Born in Seville, Sawa was of Greek origin. His father was an importer of wine and sundries. After a brief flirtation with the priesthood and a stint at the seminary of Málaga, he underwent a sudden conversion to vehement anticlericalism and thereafter studied law in Granada. He arrived in Madrid in 1885, "absurd, brilliant, and starving" (Valle-Inclán, Bohemian Lights). There he led an impoverished, marginal existence.

In 1889, he was lured to Paris by its artistic scene. For a time he worked on the staff of the Garnier publishing house, editing an encyclopedic dictionary, and had ample opportunity to strike up friendships with many of the luminaries of Parnassian and Symbolist literature, though he himself preferred the Romanticism of Victor Hugo. He translated the works of the Goncourt brothers and enjoyed what he would later regard as his "golden years". He married a Burgundian, Jeanne Poirier, and fathered a girl, Elena.

On his return to Madrid in 1896 he plunged headfirst into journalism, serving as editor of El Motín, El Globo, and La Correspondencia de España, and as a contributor to ABC, Madrid Cómico, España, and Alma Española, among others. His last years were marked by his descent into blindness and mental illness. Ironically, it was this period that yielded his only artistic success, a stage adaptation of Alphonse Daudet's Kings in Exile, in the winter of 1899. His own writings, which were largely journalistic, continued to appear in the most prestigious Spanish newspapers even as his body and mind progressively deteriorated. He wrote, "I wouldn't have wanted to be born, but I find it unbearable to die." He did so on 3 March 1909, blind and insane, in his modest house on calle Conde Duque de Madrid. Shortly before his death, the great bohemian had declared:

Sawa's personality was an inspiration to the novelists of the Generation of '98, notably Pío Baroja in The Tree of Knowledge and Valle-Inclán in Bohemian Lights. Max Estrella, the protagonist of the latter, was largely inspired by Sawa, who, though outwardly uncultivated, possessed a forceful personality and a style redolent of Hugo and Verlaine, men whom he would claim as his personal friends, along with Alphonse Daudet, Rubén Darío, and Manuel Machado. (The latter would compose an epicede in his honor.) After Sawa's death, Valle-Inclán wrote to Rubén Darío:

Posthumously published in 1910 with a prologue by Rubén Darío, Iluminaciones en la sombra marked a modernist departure from the naturalist style in which he had written his earlier novels: La mujer de todo el mundo (1885), Crimen legal (1886), Declaración de un vencido (1887), Noche (1889), Criadero de curas (1888), and La sima de Igusquiza (1888).

References 

 Amelina Correa Ramón, "Alejandro Sawa, luces de bohemia", Seville, Fundación José Manuel Lara, 2008.

External links 
  Digitized works of Alejandro Sawa in the Cervantes Virtual Library
  News story on the awarding of a literary prize to Amelina Correa for her biography of Alejandro Sawa.
  Digitized works by Alejandro Sawa at Biblioteca Digital Hispánica, Biblioteca Nacional de España (National Library of Spain)

1862 births
1909 deaths
Writers from Seville
Spanish people of Greek descent
19th-century Spanish poets
20th-century Spanish poets
19th-century Spanish journalists
20th-century Spanish journalists
Blind writers
Spanish blind people
Spanish male poets
19th-century male writers